Tacarcuna gentryi is a species of plants in the family Phyllanthaceae first described as a species in 1989.

The species has been collected in Darién Province in Panama and also in Magdalena Department in Colombia

References

Phyllanthaceae
Flora of Panama
Flora of Colombia
Plants described in 1989